Nagarjuna is an Indian actor and producer who works in the Telugu cinema. He has acted in over 100 films as a lead actor as well as playing supporting and cameo roles, including Hindi and Tamil cinema. He has received nine state Nandi Awards, three Filmfare Awards South, and one Special Mention at the National Film Awards. The 1996 film Ninne Pelladata which he produced, was declared the Best Telugu film of the year at the National Film Awards.

Nagarjuna enacted the role of 15th century composer Annamacharya in the 1997 film Annamayya; as Yavakri (the son of the ascetic Bharadwaja) in the 2002 film Agni Varsha;  as Major Padmapani Acharya in the 2003 war film, LOC Kargil; as 17th-century composer Kancherla Gopanna in the 2006 film Sri Ramadasu; as Sai Baba of Shirdi in the 2012 film Shirdi Sai; and as Chandaludu (Lord Siva in disguise) in the 2013 film Jagadguru Adi Sankara.

In 1989, Nagarjuna acted in the Maniratnam directed Romantic drama film, Geetanjali, which won the National Film Award for Best Popular Film Providing Wholesome Entertainment. In the same year, he acted in Siva, an action blockbuster directed by Ram Gopal Varma, premiered at the 13th International Film Festival of India. In 1990, he subsequently made his Bollywood debut with the Hindi remake of the same film titled Shiva, and tasted success. In 1997, he received the National Film Award for producing Ninne Pelladata. In 1998, he received the National Film Award-Special Mention for his performance in the historical film Annamayya.

In 2013, Nagarjuna represented Cinema of South India at the Delhi Film Festival's 100 Years of Indian Cinema's celebration, alongside Ramesh Sippy and Vishal Bharadwaj from Bollywood. In 1995, he ventured into film production, with a production unit operating in Seychelles, and was a co-director of an Emmy Award-winning film animation company in Michigan, U.S. Along with his brother, Venkat Akkineni, Nagarjuna is the co-owner of the production company, Annapurna Studios and is the president of the non-profit film school Annapurna International School of Film and Media based in Hyderabad.

Acting roles

Telugu films

Cameo appearances

Films in other languages

Producer

Films

Television

Music videos

See also
 List of Indian film actors
 Telugu cinema

Notes

References

Indian filmographies
Male actor filmographies